Jerry the Tyke also known as Jerry the Troublesome Tyke is a cartoon dog created during the silent film era. Created by Cardiff-based animator Sid Griffiths, and shown throughout British cinemas as part of Pathé Pictorial's screen news-magazines, Jerry the Tyke was the first animated series to be made in Wales.

History
Jerry the Troublesome Tyke was first produced in 1925 by animator Sid Griffiths and photographer Bert Bilby who both worked as projectionists at Cardiff's Capitol Cinema. They were later joined by London-based co-animator Brian White. Inspired by the American animation Felix the Cat, Jerry the Tyke was a mixture of live-action sequences and animation, similar in style to Max Fleischer's Out of the Inkwell series. 40 animations were created between 1925 and 1927, and were shown throughout the World as part of Pathé Pictorial, a fortnightly cinema news-magazine. Each silent short lasted for about four minutes and often featured Griffiths interacting with Jerry, though Jerry always remained on the drawn page.

In 2002, Welsh actor Rhys Ifans worked with BBC Wales to provide narration to several of the original Jerry the Tyke episodes, with music provided by the BBC National Orchestra of Wales. The 'lost' episodes were discovered by the Welsh Animation Group in the vaults of British Pathé at Pinewood, and have been described as "...the most comprehensive surviving material of a British screen cartoon creature" The rediscovery of the films has resulted in Jerry the Tyke being reintroduced to modern audiences, being shown on channel BBC 2W in the United Kingdom since 2002 and featuring at the Pordenone Silent Film Festival in 2005 and the British Silent Film Festival in 2010. Today the films form part of the collection of the National Screen and Sound Archive of Wales.

Most recently Jerry the Tyke has been brought back to life by musician and composer Simon Lovatt. National Screen and Sound Archive of Wales and Arad Goch teamed up to provide young audiences a taste of Jerry the Tyke. Performed for the first time at the 2012 "Opening Doors" Performing Arts Festival for Young Audiences at the "Drum" in the National Library of Wales. The show was toured in 2013.

Filmography
 Jerry the Troublesome Tyke (1925) 
 Honesty Is the Best Policy (1925)
 Jerry's Treasure Island Travel (1925)
 Jerry Tracks The Treasure (1925)
 There's Many a Slip (1925)
 Jerry's Test Trial (1925)
 A Very Jerry Expedition (1925)
 The Joy Provider (1925)
 Never Say Die (1925)
 A Bird in the Hand (1925) 
 In and Out of Wembley (1925)
 Jerry's Done it Again (1925)
 Curing a Cold (1925)
 The Deputy (1926) 
 "Weather" or Not (1926)
 Ten Little Nigger Boys (1926), now referred to as Ten Little Jerry Boys
 All Cod! (1926)
 One Exciting Nightmare (1926)
 Both Biters Bit (1926)
 When Jerry Papered the Parlour (1926)
 A Wireless Whirl (1926)
 We Nearly Lose Him (1926)
 He Breaks Out (1926)
 A Splash and a Dash (1926)
 A Flash Affair (1926)
 Football (1926)
 Going West (1926)
 A Sticky Business (1926)
 All Up a Tree (1926)
 Golf (1926)
 He Gets "Fired" (1926)
 Jerry is Too Canny for the Cannibals (1926)
 Jerry Sacks a Saxophone (1926)
 Shown Up! (1926)
 Spoofing a Spook (1926)
 Treasure Hunting (1926)
 Weight and see (1926)
 C.O.D. (1926)
 His Birthday (1927)
 Great Expectations (1927)

Notes

Film characters introduced in 1925
Film series introduced in 1925
Animated characters
Animated film series
Fictional anthropomorphic characters
Fictional dogs
Animated characters introduced in 1925